Laurent Delahaye (born 6 January 1977) is a French former racing driver.

References

1977 births
Living people
French racing drivers
International Formula 3000 drivers
Place of birth missing (living people)

Piquet GP drivers
Team Rosberg drivers
German Formula Three Championship drivers